The 1956–57 Swedish Division I season was the 13th season of Swedish Division I. Gävle GIK won the league title by finishing first in the final round.

First round

Northern Group

Southern Group

Final round

External links
 1956–57 season

Swe
Swedish Division I seasons
1956–57 in Swedish ice hockey